Ambodiharina  is a village and commune in the Mahanoro District, Atsinanana Region, Madagascar.

It is located near the coast and on the south side of the mouth of the Mangoro River, and south of Mahanoro (the chief city of the district).  The village of Salehy lies across from the town on the north side of the river.

It residents are of the Betsimisaraka people.  The research of American anthropologist Jennifer Cole has focused on their memories of colonialism.

The 2001 population of the commune was 20,217.  According to Cole, the population of the village around the same time was 1,500.

The road known as Route nationale 11 (Madagascar) runs through the village, though one must cross the river by boat to proceed north on the road to Mahanoro.

References

Further reading
Jennifer Cole.  Forget Colonialism?: Sacrifice and the Art of Memory in Madagascar (2001)

Cities in Madagascar
Populated places in Atsinanana